Marino Trigo Serrano (31 August 1900 – 3 August 1990) was a Spanish water polo player who competed in the 1928 Summer Olympics. He was part of the Spanish team  in the 1928 tournament. He played in the only match for Spain.

References

1900 births
1990 deaths
Spanish male water polo players
Water polo players at the 1928 Summer Olympics
Olympic water polo players of Spain